Partex Group is one of the largest family-run conglomerates in Bangladesh, consisting of over 70 factories. The industries under this conglomerate include foods and beverages, steel, real estate, furniture, agribusiness, plastics,  etc.

History 
It started in 1962, by industrialist M. A. Hashem with commodity trading. Now it owns over 70 subsidiaries from tobacco to consumer goods, furniture, textile and the IT sector. It has split into two groups to improve management of its subsidiaries - Partex Holdings and Partex Star Group.

Partex's companies are in nearly all sectors, including food and beverages, plastics, fabrics, cotton, sugar, paper, jute, shipping, furniture, agribusiness, oil, cables, aviation, PVC, telecommunication, logistics, fisheries, education, services, IT, denim fabric industry and many more. 

M. A. Hashem also founded two leading private banks in Bangladesh – The City Bank and United Commercial Bank Limited (UCB).

List of companies

Partex Cables Limited
 Star Particle Board Mills Limited 
 Partex Furniture
 Partex Builders Limited
 Star Gypsum Board Mills Limited
 Partex Laminates Limited
 Partex PVC Industries Limited
 Partex Agro Limited
 Rubel Steel Mills Limited 
 Corvee Maritime Co. Limited
 Ferrotechnic Limited
 Partex Limited 
 Partex Housing Limited
 Danish Condensed Milk (BD) Ltd  
 Danish Foods Limited 
 Danish Distribution Network Limited 
 Danish Milk Bangladesh Limited
 Danish Dairy Farm Limited
 Partex Pulp & Paper Mills Limited 
 Partex Paper Mills Limited
 Partex Board Mills Limited 
 Partex Sugar Mills Limited 
 Amber Cotton Mills Limited (UNIT-1)
 Amber Cotton Mills Limited (UNIT-2)
Amber Board Mills Limited 
Amber Denim 
 Partex Rotor Spinning Mills Limited
 Partex Denim Limited
 Partex Denim Mills Limited
 Partex Energy Limited 
 Partex Holdings
 Dhakacom Limited
 Star Vegetable Oil Mills Ltd.
 Partex Properties Limited 
 Partex Beverage Limited 
 Partex Plastics Limited
 Partex Foundry Limited 
 Partex Jute Limited 
 Partex Shipyards Limited
 Partex Oil Tankers
 Partex Cables Ltd.
 Partex Aeromarine Logistics Ltd.
 Partex Fisheries Ltd.
 Partex Aviation Ltd.
 Partex Ceramics Ltd.
 New Era Milk Processing Ltd.
 New Horizon Farms Ltd.
 Partex Accessories Ltd.
 Royal Crown Cola Ltd. 
 MUM Water Ltd. 
 New Light Star Apparels Ltd.
 Partex Fashions Limited. (Red Origin)
 Reluce
 Partex Sporting Club
 Partex Power Generation Company Ltd.
 Star Adhesives Ltd.
 Shubornobhumi Housing Ltd.
 Voicetell Ltd.
 Geometric Business Development Ltd.
 Partex Tissue Ltd.
 Giovana Denim Mills Ltd.
 Fabiana Flour Mills Ltd. 
 Fairhope Housing Ltd.
 Triple Apparels Ltd.
 Partex Petro Ltd.

See also
 List of companies of Bangladesh

References

External links
 

Conglomerate companies of Bangladesh
Conglomerate companies established in 1959
1959 establishments in East Pakistan